Wiley B. Glass (1874 - November 14, 1967), a Southern Baptist missionary, established his primary location, the North China Mission in Hwanghsien, China. He was best known in China by his local name Kuo Mu-Shih. Glass was dearly loved by Chinese and missionaries alike. He was considered the rock on which the missionaries were held together in Hwanghsien and the light that led so many to Christ. His primary work was teaching and then leading the North China Mission's Seminary in Hwanghsien which produced many strong leaders of Christ. He had a great heart for the poor and headed up many famine relief projects and, with his colleagues and some of the native believers, helped to establish a Red Cross Organization. This gave him good standing personally and provided a "great face" for himself and foreigners in general among many of the Chinese. Although he was one of the lesser known missionaries to China during this period, he nonetheless produced some of the greatest work. His daughter, Eloise Glass Cauthen, who wrote his biography in her book Higher Ground, and her husband, Baker James Cauthen (an official in the Southern Baptist Convention Foreign Mission Board), followed faithfully in his footsteps and greatly served the Chinese for many years. It can be sure that Wiley Glass' years of faithful service are a reason that the Chinese Church has such a solid foundation and has exploded the way it has.

Early life
Born in Franklin County, Texas to Henry Clay and Teedie Glass, Wiley was the subject of his mother's fervent prayers, as she prayed that her son would not grow up in his father's unbelief. She prayed, "O God, take this child, keep him and use him. And save his father, please." Not much later his father had a powerful conversion experience and lived a life of religious devotion.

Years later on the way to a Methodist revival meeting, Glass' sister pleaded with him to give his life to Christ. The following morning the preacher spoke on the Revelation 3:20, and Glass let the Lord know that he needed and wanted him, and in that moment he felt the Lord had heard him and he walked forward and gave his life to Christ.

Later Glass was asked to lead a church. After serious prayer and through preaching in the church got his call to go to Baylor College. While he was at Baylor, one of Glass' professors, Dr. Tanner, the man who had the most profound influence on his life said, after hearing news of the Boxer Rebellion, a military uprising in which Chinese Christians and "foreign" missionaries were killed, "These things are added proof of [China's] need of the gospel. If China had been Christian, this would not be happening." This moved Glass to become more zealous about foreign missions. (p. 33) Soon afterwards a revival on campus brought many Baylor students, including Wiley Glass, to a sense of a calling to missions. After marrying Eunice Taylor on July 22, 1903, Glass set out for China with his new bride.

Work in China
The Glasses began working with the Southern Baptist Convention's North China Mission and were first set up in LaiChowFu to study language. Wiley and Eunice had their first baby, Taylor, in August. Unfortunately he caught pneumonia. By the time Wiley could reach the doctor on his new bicycle and come back with him, Taylor was too sick and later died. This was a tragic time, but soon after Wiley was blessed and his language improved. He helped his Chinese teacher give up bad habits and got him reading the Gospel of John. This was the first man he led to Christ.

Soon through the work of the Holy Spirit and the Chinese teacher Mr. Sun, nearly the whole village of forty to fifty families was led to Christ. In 1906 Wiley and Eunice had their second child and named him Bentley. Later in 1907, when the World Missions Conference was held in Shanghai, Glass represented the North China Mission. By this time, 100 years after Robert Morrison arrived from England as the first Protestant missionary to China, there were nearly a quarter of a million Christians in China (much more than were ever hoped for).

Shortly after the conference the dikes in the Yellow River burst into and destroyed many homes and drowned thousands. Glass and fellow missionary John Lowe went to Chingkiang and volunteered to help the victims. Horror, death, misery, and starvation were all around. This extremely challenging and exhausting time for Glass helped to raise support and awareness for China and to attract additional missionaries, and it also increased Chinese respect for "foreigners." After weeks as a relief worker, Glass returned home, and his first daughter, named Lois Corneille, was born not long afterward on November 25, 1907.

In 1908 a new step in Glass's mission career happened - he became part of the staff for the North China Baptist Training School for Preachers and Teachers in Hwanghsien. Glass felt that through teaching he could multiply himself by sending numerous native Chinese out to share the gospel. These Chinese Christian workers went throughout Shandong Provinces and into other provinces such as Henan and Anhwei and even up into the far areas of Manchuria. This was a delightful but also strenuous time for Glass. Lesson preparation took several hours, especially for Old Testament and church history classes, for which he had to learn countless names in Chinese. In this fruitful time, the student body quickly grew to 40. It was in Hwanghsien that the Glasses' second daughter, Eloise, named for Eunice's favorite sister-in-law, was born.

After seven years in China and this newest addition to the family, Wiley, Eunice, and the children took their first furlough back to the United States in 1910. They had mixed emotions upon returning because Eunice's mother had died and her father had remarried. However Eunice loved her stepmother and spent a wonderful year with her while Wiley spent most of the time traveling in the Southern states, including Alabama, and traveled to Philadelphia and other Northern cities to tell what God was doing in China. Following their furlough, the Glasses returned to a much disturbed China, where the regime of the Empress Dowager was tottering and emerging plans for a modern China challenged old ways. Armed revolutionaries marched across Shandong Province, so the Glass family move to Chefoo where Eunice might be able to have her expected baby in peace. (p. 74)

The seminary in Hwanghsien was closed during this time, and anyone without a hair queue was subject to beheading. Several Chinese Christians, sympathetic to the new movement, cut their hair. The Glasses and Bessie Hartwell, a fellow missionary's wife, returned to Hwangshien despite the military conflict there. They connected with Lottie Moon at the Southern Baptist hospital in that city.

By October 1912, cities in northern China had declared their sympathy with the revolution and ousted the imperial government officials. (p. 76). Eventually, however, imperialists took control of the city and many men not wearing queues were executed. Fortunately most Chinese Christians (some of whom had no queues) gained neutral status through their for the Red Cross and care for wounded soldiers, and so were not killed.

Not much later Eunice got sick twice with pleurisy and their fourth child, Wiley, got dysentery and died not much later. Glass wrote home in his and his wife's name, "Heaven is nearer and Christ is dearer with our two boys over there in His arms." His pain, however, appears in the letter's signature, "your sorrowing brother and sister" (p. 86).

The following years in China were difficult. Famine followed revolution, drought extended for three years, and death was rampant in Central China and crept closer and closer their way. About this time the indomitable Lottie Moon became depressed amid the widespread distress. Her missionary colleagues decided that she should return to the United States, and she died on this ship home, in Kobe, Japan (p. 87).

Despite these great pains and hardships, the ministry was blessed to be very fruitful during this time. According to Glass's daughter Eloise, "In Laichowfu a building had been dedicated for the Woman's Training School, and 2 churches had been organized. The North China Mission had 5 stations with work extending from Manchuria on the north to the extreme southwest of Shantung. There were 26 churches; they baptized 1003 during the year, about one fourth of the total membership. One day at Pignut 130 were baptized… Sunday schools numbered 95. [The] 111 day and boarding schools had 1,848 pupils and 3 hospitals treated 25,800 patients" (p. 87-88).

Later Eunice took the children on vacation to Chefoo and got deathly ill with a cold. She refused to leave China, not able to bear thinking about hindering her husband's work. She was diagnosed with tuberculosis and struggled for nine long months and on April 13 he would die. Glass wrote to his brother and sisters at home, "I would be untrue to her glorious, courageous example as she faced the future and endured for nine long months such weariness, pain and anxiety, so joyously, if I were not as brave as she. The inspiration of her pure, noble life is mine forever. I find God's face not turned from me, but a consciousness of His nearness and love and strength constantly at hand." Still, Glass's grief and the strain of finances made it hard to push on (p. 92). He eventually decided to send his two remaining daughters to boarding school with his 8-year-old son Bentley. He was very lonely at Hwanghsien but a new seminary colleague and opportunities kept his mind busy, as he procured Christian literature for the churches, opened stores to sell this literature, and arranged for its distribution. (p. 92)

Glass also began housing missionaries to fill his home, and he loved having his children home on holiday. His heart began to warm again, and in 1915 Glass became president of the North China Mission. A wonderful, enthusiastic, dearly loved, and dear lover of the Lord named Jessi Pettigrew was a missionary and nurse to the people of China and one of the women who so wonderfully took care of Wiley's children after the death of his beloved wife. After spending more time with her, Wiley fell deeply in love with her and after some years of hardship, eventually all former opposition approved and they married on March 13, 1916, in Japan. The children referred to her as "mother" as naturally as if they had never known her by any other name. (p. 103) and eventually they had two children of their own – Gertrude and Bryan in 1917 and 1919.

Months later many continued to become Christians and were baptized in Hwangshien Church. Eventually there were so many that in a nearby port city, called Lung K'o (pu tong hua – Long Kou or Dragon's Mouth), the Lung K'o Baptist church was opened on November 7, 1916 and Wiley was chosen to be pastor and had a wonderful relationship with the church throughout his time in China.

1932, the year following a huge calamity and famine where Wiley was once again a wonderful but overwhelmed and exhausted relief work, was one of the sweetest and most special years in Wiley's work - revival broke out all around and numerous people came to Christ. There was incredible and deep confession of sin all around, people gained an incredible appreciation and zeal for the reading and spreading of the Truth, and many new students came to the seminary. This helped to prepare the people during the persecution when missionaries were forced to leave and financial support from abroad was taken away. (p. 156)

Later, as Glass was pastor of Tengchow church (Lottie Moon's original post), revival continued to happen, the church was packed even during freezing weather, and many came to Christ. One man noted – "Christ was made real and precious. Opium smokers were delivered from their bondage, the lost were saved, Christians became witnesses, and churches were established that were self-supporting from the first."

Years later Hwanghsien came under Japanese control. Forty years of wonderful education work in that area came to a close when the authorities demanded that all Christian schools be closed and Confucianism was the way of life. On top of this there forty years of hospital work with Warren Memorial Hospital was closed after Japanese declared they could only see patients with a permit yet allowed no patient to ever have a permit.

Following this Wiley and Jessi Glass moved to Chefoo. These were some scarce times – about the only food in supply were potatoes and many churches and places were having to close and soon Wiley and all foreigners were assigned to housing units. They soon held services and Wiley was unanimously voted Pastor. Eventually they were on their way back to America. Wiley held services on the ship home to a great response. In November 1943 Wiley and Jessi arrived in New York City. After Wiley turned seventy there were still many requests from missionaries on the field for him to return to help and preach to all the refugees in the communist overtaken worn torn country. Before he could return he began ministering to Chinese air cadets in training at Kelly Field, San Antonio, Texas. Many men were led to Christ. (p. 214).

Unfortunately Wiley was not able to return to China because of the great Communist takeover and oppression. All foreigners were either made to leave or decided to on their own because of the problem it caused for Chinese Christians. "Sometimes family and others asked if [he] had not thrown [his] life away. Had all the labors in China gone down the drain? 'No', [Wiley] said, 'I am completely satisfied with having given my life to mission work in China. I just wish I had another to give. Although church and mission buildings have been appropriated by the government or destroyed, God remains. And hundreds of thousands of people continue in him and in serving others in his name. The fires that now burn to destroy the Christian religion in China are the crucible of purification that will produce a more virile Christian church – a church that will bless the world in the years ahead." (p. 218) Throughout the next few years of their lives Wiley and Jessi went around teaching, preaching, and sharing about China and missions wherever they could.

Memorial
They eventually settled down in Fort Worth, Texas and it was Glass's great joy to teach Sunday school at the Gambrell Street Baptist Church there. Jessi died on October 14, 1962. Glass died on November 14, 1967. It was said that his rock-like convictions brought stability to all whom he influenced. Withal he was gentle and loving. He was a great preacher, and he could read and spoke the Chinese language so well that the Chinese respected and loved him and even the unlearned could understand him. His daughter wrote, "He stood on higher ground." (p. 223)

References

 

1874 births
1967 deaths
Baptist missionaries in China
Baptist missionaries from the United States
People from Franklin County, Texas
20th-century Baptists
American expatriates in China
Southern Baptists